Da'irat ul-Ma'arif was an Arabic encyclopedia published by Butrus al-Bustani in 1875. It is considered the first modern encyclopedia published in Arabic.

References 

Arabic literature
Encyclopedias
Nahda
19th-century encyclopedias